Nierembergia , common name cupflower, is a genus of plants in the nightshade family. It is named after the Spanish Jesuit and mystic Juan Eusebio Nieremberg (1595-1658).

Selected species
 Nierembergia espinosae
 Nierembergia linariifolia
 Nierembergia rivularis
 Nierembergia scoparia (cupflower)
 Nierembergia veitchii

References

Petunioideae
Solanaceae genera